Dany Michael Ferreira Marques (born 8 March 1991) is a Portuguese professional footballer who plays for C.D. Fátima as a forward.

Club career
On 21 August 2016, Marques made his professional debut with Académica in a 2016–17 LigaPro match against Penafiel.

References

External links

Stats and profile at LPFP 

1991 births
Living people
People from Leiria
Portuguese footballers
Association football forwards
Liga Portugal 2 players
Segunda Divisão players
Associação Académica de Coimbra – O.A.F. players
C.D. Fátima players
Sportspeople from Leiria District